Howard Augustine "Humpy" Wheeler (born October 23, 1938) is the former President and General Manager of Charlotte Motor Speedway, one of the premier auto racing venues owned by Bruton Smith's Speedway Motorsports, Inc.  Better known as H.A. or "Humpy" Wheeler, he has long been known as one of the foremost promoters of NASCAR auto racing.

Nickname
During an appearance on the National Public Radio quiz show Wait Wait... Don't Tell Me! in July 2006, Wheeler explained the origin of his nickname. He said that when his father had played football at the University of Illinois, he was caught once smoking Camel cigarettes, earning the name "Humpy" for the camel's hump. His father's friends then began calling him "Humpy Jr."  Growing up through high school, college football, and then racing, the name "Humpy" has stuck with him.

Early life
Wheeler was born in Belmont, North Carolina. He began his promotional career at age nine, selling tickets for a bicycle race. He was a defensive lineman for the South Carolina Gamecocks in the late 1950s. His teammates included future NASCAR communications director Jim Hunter (a running back), and Jim Duncan (later known as a marketing executive at Lowe's Motor Speedway). Wheeler was also an amateur race car driver during his early years.

Promotions
After becoming the president of Charlotte Motor Speedway, Wheeler earned the reputation for organizing publicity stunts.  A few weeks after driver Cale Yarborough gave the less-than-complimentary nickname 'Jaws' to rival driver Darrell Waltrip, Wheeler bought a giant dead shark, placed a dead chicken in the shark's mouth, and had it driven around the track on a flatbed truck before a race at Charlotte (Yarborough's sponsor at the time was Holly Farms Poultry).  In 1984, the pre-race show for the World 600 was a reenactment of Operation Urgent Fury, the invasion of Grenada the previous year.

In 2007, Wheeler announced that the Bank of America 500 would feature an "all-you-can-eat grandstand," where fans would pay a set ticket price, and would then get to eat as much as they wanted of the grandstand's food before, during, and after the race.  The publicity for this event included Nathan's Hot Dog Eating Contest champion Joey Chestnut at the press conference.

Retirement
The Coca-Cola 600 held on May 25, 2008 was to be Wheeler's last race as President of the Lowe's Motor Speedway.  Steve Byrnes of FOX Sports and Speed TV honored Wheeler before the race and Wheeler in turn gave a speech thanking race fans from all over the United States in addition to people from foreign countries for coming to the race: "I owe a tremendous gratitude to you for buying tickets to our facility. If we meet again may you be in the palm of God."

Although he had announced that he would step down as President and General Manager of Lowe's Motor Speedway soon after the race, Wheeler had hopes of staying on as a part-time consultant especially in light of the upcoming 50th anniversary of the Speedway in 2009.  However, apparently due to a falling out with Bruton Smith for reasons yet unknown, Wheeler's lengthy association with Lowe's Motor Speedway was unceremoniously ended.  Smith thereafter wasted no time in appointing his son, Marcus Smith, as the new President and General Manager of the Speedway. 
 
During an interview on Speed TV's "Wind Tunnel" on June 1, 2008, Wheeler stated that in addition to working as a part-time consultant, one of his primary projects during retirement will be working on a book devoted to his recollections of the numerous personalities he has known over his many years as a racing promoter at Lowe's Motor Speedway and prior to that during his years in Indianapolis and at the Bonneville Salt Flats in Utah.

Recently, in an off-track but still automotive related pursuit, Wheeler provided the voice for "Tex," a 1975 Cadillac Coupe de Ville cartoon character, in the 2006 Pixar hit film Cars and its 2017 sequel Cars 3.

On August 18, 2008, Wheeler announced the formation of The Wheeler Company, a consulting management firm focusing on general business, professional sports, and motorsports. Wheeler serves as chairman, with his son Howard III ("Trip") serving as president.

Wheeler was inducted into the International Motorsports Hall of Fame on April 27, 2006 and to the Motorsports Hall of Fame of America on August 12, 2009.
In April 2011, Wheeler appeared on an episode of The History Channel's American Pickers in which he donated items to be placed in the NASCAR Hall of Fame.

Grand Prix of America
In October 2011, Wheeler was announced as one of the principals behind the Grand Prix of America, a Formula One race to be run in New Jersey starting with the 2014 Formula One season.

Speedway Benefits
In the fall of 2013, Wheeler once again made auto racing news as he announced the foundation of Speedway Benefits, a marketing and advertising partnership seeking to combine short-tracks across the United States into a single body for the purposes of contract negotiations with suppliers, advertisers, and business partners. Seeing such an alliance as a way to strengthen the bargaining positions of racetrack owners and to stymy the increasing power of NASCAR in North American auto racing, the organization seeks to "grow grassroots racing." By combining more than 1000 short track venues across North America into a collective body, Speedway Benefits argues that the purchasing power and fan base of short track racing exceeds that of other, established national sports leagues, thus potentially enabling short track owners to bargain more effectively and to pursue national level sponsorships of local and regional venues.

Hobbies and interests

Wheeler has had a longtime interest in bicycle sports beginning with organizing bicycle races in his early teens. He continues to be an avid cyclist and can be seen at numerous cycling trails and tracks around his hometown. Along with this he is a prized boxer having been involved in boxing his whole life. He has a 40-2 record as an amateur and was a Carolinas Golden Glove champion as a light heavyweight boxing out of Belmont, N.C and Columbia, S.C. He has been inducted into the Carolinas Boxing Hall of Fame.  Wheeler has maintained his boxing regimen and continues to stay in shape doing so.

References

Bibliography

External links
 The Wheeler Company
 

Living people
People from Belmont, North Carolina
1938 births
Auto racing executives
International Motorsports Hall of Fame inductees
NASCAR people
South Carolina Gamecocks football players
Charlotte Catholic High School alumni